Moussa Alzouma is a Nigerien footballer who plays as a goalkeeper.

External links 
 

1982 births
Living people
Association football goalkeepers
Nigerien footballers
Niger international footballers
2013 Africa Cup of Nations players
Niger A' international footballers
2011 African Nations Championship players
2016 African Nations Championship players
2020 African Nations Championship players